The Kingdom of Mercia was a state in the English Midlands from the 6th century to the 10th century. For some two hundred years from the mid-7th century onwards it was the dominant member of the Heptarchy and consequently the most powerful of the Anglo-Saxon kingdoms. During this period its rulers became the first English monarchs to assume such wide-ranging titles as King of Britain and King of the English.

Spellings varied widely in this period, even within a single document, and a number of variants exist for the names given below. For example, the sound th was usually represented with the Old English letters ð or þ.

For the Continental predecessors of the Mercians in Angeln, see List of kings of the Angles. For their successors see List of English monarchs.

Kings of the Mercians

The traditional rulers of Mercia were known as the Iclingas, descendants of the kings of the Angles. When the Iclingas became extinct in the male line, a number of other families, labelled B, C and W by historians, competed for the throne.

All the following are kings, unless specified. Those in italics are probably legendary, are of dubious authenticity, or may not have reigned.

Titular kings following Mercia's annexation

Ealdormen and Earls of the Mercians
The chief magnate of Mercia as an English province held the title of ealdorman until 1023/32, and earl thereafter. Both offices were royal appointments, but the latter in effect became hereditary.

Earls of March

The title Earl of March (etymologically identical to 'Earl of Mercia') was created in the western Midlands for Roger Mortimer in 1328. It has fallen extinct, and been recreated, three times since then, and exists today as a subsidiary title of the Duke of Richmond and Lennox.

Kings of Mercia family tree

References

Mercia
 
Mercia